Darreh Susan (also Romanized as Darreh Sūsan) is a village in Sornabad Rural District, Hamaijan District, Sepidan County, Fars Province, Iran. At the 2006 census, its population was 48 in 12 families.

References 

Populated places in Sepidan County